Noël Vidot (born 15 December 1962 in Saint-Denis) is a French professional football player and manager.

Career
He played for the Le Havre AC, Nîmes Olympique, Stade Lavallois and Le Mans FC. He was a member of the French squad that won a silver medal at the 1987 Mediterranean Games.

In 1994, he began his coaching career. He coaches the CS Saint-Denis, US Cambuston and AS Chaudron. In 2007, he was a head coach of the Réunion national football team.

References

External links

1962 births
Living people
Footballers from Réunion
French footballers
Association football midfielders
Le Havre AC players
Nîmes Olympique players
Stade Lavallois players
Le Mans FC players
Ligue 1 players
Ligue 2 players
Competitors at the 1987 Mediterranean Games
Mediterranean Games silver medalists for France
Football managers from Réunion
French football managers
Réunion national football team managers
Sportspeople from Saint-Denis, Réunion
Mediterranean Games medalists in football
INF Vichy players